The 2020–21 Czech Cup, known as the MOL Cup for sponsorship reasons, was the 28th season of the annual knockout football tournament of the Czech Republic. It began with the first round on 11 August 2020 and ended with the final on 20 May 2021. The winner of the cup gained the right to play in the third qualifying round of the 2021–22 UEFA Europa League.

Teams

Preliminary round
No preliminary round was held.

First round

Second round
12 First League teams not playing in European competitions, except Pardubice, joined 42 of the first round winners in the second round of competition. First round winner SK Uničov was not in the draw. The official date for second round matches is 16 September. Dukla Prague and Hradec Kralové received walkovers to the third round as their scheduled opponents, Aritma Prague and Olympie Březová, decided not to follow the required coronavirus testing protocols.

Third round

Fourth round

Quarter-finals
The match between SK Sigma Olomouc and SK Slavia Prague was postponed due to Slavia Prague's participation in the 2020–21 UEFA Europa League quarter-finals.

Semi-finals

Final

See also
 2020–21 Czech First League
 2020–21 Czech National Football League

References

External links
Season on soccerway.com

Czech Cup seasons
Cup
Czech